Media Station may refer to:

Media Station (company), a Japanese adult video company
Media station (SEPTA), a SEPTA train station in Media, Pennsylvania
Media–Orange Street station, a SEPTA trolley station in Media, Pennsylvania

See also
Media (disambiguation)